Laronius is a monotypic genus of Southeast Asian ground spiders containing the single species, Laronius erewan. It was first described by Christa L. Deeleman-Reinhold in 2001, and has only been found in Thailand and in Sumatra.

References

Gnaphosidae
Monotypic Araneomorphae genera
Spiders of Asia